Group C of the 2011 CONCACAF Gold Cup was one of three groups competing of nations at CONCACAF Gold Cup 2011. The group's first round of matches were played on June 7, with the final round played on June 14. All six group matches were played at venues in United States, in Detroit, Tampa and Kansas City. The group consisted of host, and four time Gold Cup champions, United States, 2000 Gold Cup champion Canada, as well as Panama and Guadeloupe.

The group opened on June 7 with Panama taking an early three-goal lead against Guadeloupe before Brice Jovial of Guadeloupe brought the match within a goal's reach. However, the Panamanians were able to withstand Guadeloupe's late pressure and win their opening fixture. Immediately after the match, group favorites Canada and the United States squared off. Analysts claimed that the Canadian squad was the strongest in their history, possibly the strongest since the mid-1980s squad that qualified for the 1986 FIFA World Cup. For the Americans, they had come off a humbling 4–0 defeat in a tune up match against defending World champions, Spain. In spite of the rough patch endured by the United States, they were still considered favorites to beat Canada. Thanks to an early, 15th-minute goal from Jozy Altidore, along with a complementary second half goal from Clint Dempsey gave the United States a 2–0 win over Canada and the lead in the group.

While Canada expectedly defeated Guadeloupe on June 11, Panama pulled off a stunning 2–1 upset over the United States, in which some cited as possibly the largest upset of the entire tournament. The match marked the first time in Gold Cup history that the United States lost on its home soil during Group Stage play. It was also the first time since the 1985 CONCACAF Championship, that the United States lost on home ground in a continental tournament. Clearance Goodson scored the lone goal for the United States in the 66th minute, after he conceded an own goal for the Panamanians in the 19th minute. Panama's Gabriel Enrique Gómez converted a penalty kick in the 33rd minute, which ended up being the winner.

The group wrapped up play on June 14 with Panama and Canada playing each other followed by Guadeloupe taking on the United States. The matches were a doubleheader held at Livestrong Sporting Park in Kansas City.

Standings

All Times are U.S. Eastern Daylight Time (UTC−4) (Local Times in parentheses)

Panama vs Guadeloupe

United States vs Canada

Canada vs Guadeloupe

United States vs Panama

Canada vs Panama

Guadeloupe vs United States

External links
 

C
Gold Cup
Gold